HR 4729 (HD 108250) is a multiple star system located about  from the Sun in the constellation of Crux and part of the asterism known as the Southern Cross.  It is a close companion of α Crucis and sometimes called α Crucis C.

Nomenclature
HR 4729 is the star's designation in the Bright Star Catalogue. It is also often referred to by its Henry Draper Catalogue listing of HD 108250. Because of its closeness to α Crucis it is included in many multiple star catalogues as α Crucis C. It is also listed as star 25 in Crux in the Uranometria Argentina, displayed as 25 G. Crucis.

Discovery
HR 4729 was first observed in 1829, as a companion to α Crucis, by James Dunlop from Paramatta in New South Wales.  As early as 1916, HR 4729 was reported to have a variable radial velocity indicating a likely binary system, but the orbital elements were not calculated until 1979.

System

HR 4729 lies 90 arcseconds away from the triple star system of α Crucis and shares its motion through space, suggesting it may be gravitationally bound to it, and it is therefore generally assumed to be physically associated. In the context of being a companion to α Crucis it is usually referred to as α Crucis C.

HR 4729 is itself a close spectroscopic binary system with a period of 1 day 5 hours.  It also has a faint visual companion 2.1" away. A further seven faint stars are also listed as members of the α Crucis group out to a distance of about two arc-minutes.  One particular companion very close to HR 4729 has been resolved using adaptive optics at infrared wavelengths.  It has been named α Crucis P, or α Crucis CP because it is only 2" from HR 4729.

Rizzuto and colleagues determined in 2011 that the α Crucis system, including HR 4729, was 66% likely to be a member of the Lower Centaurus–Crux sub-group of the Scorpius–Centaurus association. It was not previously seen to be a member of the group because of confusion over the true radial velocity of the spectroscopic pair.

On 2008 October 2, the Cassini–Huygens spacecraft resolved three of the components (A, B and C) of the multiple star system as Saturn's disk occulted it.

Stellar properties
HR 4729 is a hot class B main sequence star nearly ten times as massive as the sun.  It is only about twelve million years old, but already shows signs of evolving away from the main sequence.  Several studies have assigned a subgiant luminosity class to the star.

The spectroscopic companion cannot be seen in the spectrum, therefore little is known about its properties.  Analysis of the orbit shows that it has a mass greater than the sun.

The physically associated companion α Crucis D or α Crucis CP is a 15th magnitude star.  Its relative faintness suggests an M0 V spectral type.  Two other, even fainter stars, lie within  of HR 4729.

References

External links
 http://www.daviddarling.info/encyclopedia/A/Acrux.html

Double stars
B-type main-sequence stars
Crux (constellation)
Lower Centaurus Crux
Crucis, 25
Spectroscopic binaries
4729
108250
Durchmusterung objects